The GAM-67 Crossbow was a turbojet-powered anti-radar missile built by Northrop's Ventura Division, the successor to the Radioplane Company who developed the Crossbow's predecessor, the Q-1 target drone.

Development
In the late 1940s, the Radioplane Company developed a set of prototypes of the Q-1 target series, which used pulsejet or small turbojet engines. Although the Q-1 series was not put into production as a target, it did evolve into the USAF RP-54D / XB-67 / XGAM-67 Crossbow anti-radar missile, which was first flown in 1956. It was also considered as a platform for reconnaissance, electronic countermeasures, and decoy roles.

The Crossbow had a cigar-shaped fuselage, straight wings, a straight twin-fin tail, and an engine inlet under the belly. It was powered by a Continental J69 turbojet engine, with 4.41 kN (450 kgf/1,000 lbf) thrust. Two Crossbows could be carried by a Boeing B-50 Superfortress bomber, while four Crossbows could be carried by a Boeing B-47 Stratojet bomber.

The Crossbow's speed was not enough to allow it to get far ahead of the launching bomber before it ran out of fuel. Only 14 Crossbows were built before the program was cancelled in 1957, in favor of the Longbow, essentially a supersonic version of the same concept. Longbow was eventually cancelled as well. None of the alternative roles were taken up either, with all work on the concept ending in 1960. However, it did point the way to the range of missions that would be performed by UAVs in later decades.

References

 Early versions of this article contained material that originally came from the web article Unmanned Aerial Vehicles by Greg Goebel, which was published into the Public Domain.

GAM-067
GAM-067